Snegithiye is a 2000 Tamil-language mystery thriller film directed by Priyadarshan. The film notably features only female characters, played by Tabu, Jyothika, Sharbani Mukherjee and Ishita Arun. Music was composed by Vidyasagar. The film, released in 2000, proved to be an average grosser at the box office but bagged positive reviews from critics. Originally planned to be made as a bilingual, in Tamil and in Malayalam, the film released first in Tamil only, while the Malayalam version, Raakilipattu, as well as the dubbed Hindi version, Friendship, released seven years later. The film's story is loosely based on the 1999 Marathi film Bindhaast written by Chandrakant Kulkarni.

Plot
Best friends Vani "Vasu" Subramaniyam  and Radhika are carefree pranksters at a prestigious ladies' college in Chennai. They stay up late, break rules and wreak havoc at their hostel, much to their lecturers' annoyance. They also form a rivalry against Gita, the college queen bee. Malathi,  Radhika's aunt, wants her niece to complete her studies, so that she can take over her late parents' multi-million business. In order to straighten Radhika out, Malathi arranges for her to get married.

At this point, Vasu and Radhika are introduced to Gayathri, a fiercely independent and strong police officer and an alumnus of their college. During an event at the college, Gayathri explains how women in the country lose their independence and livelihood after getting married. Convinced that they should avoid marriage as long as possible, Vani and Radhika pretend that Radhika has a boyfriend from overseas, named Ramesh, in order to avoid Malathi from arranging anymore suitors. However, this fantasy takes a whole new turn when an actual person named Ramesh calls and sends Radhika letters, claiming to be her boyfriend. To end this nuisance, Vasu and Radhika invite Ramesh to their hostel during the college dance program and plan to trick him into blurt out the truth. Vasu instructs Radhika to bring her aunt's guns for their safety.

However, a mysterious shooter kills Ramesh before the girls can confront him. Fearing that suspicion would fall on them, they decide to dispose of the body by hiding it in the air ventilator. Unexpectedly, the body slides down the vent and lands on the auditorium stage, in the middle of a performance. Gayathri, who is the guest of honour at the event, takes charge of the case. She finds Radhika's necklace on the body and the two girls are brought in for questioning. At the police station, an old woman shows up claiming that Ramesh is her son and has gone missing. Realising that the noose is tightening and that the story of their innocence would not stand, Vasu and Radhika escape police custody and hide in an abandoned mansion on the outskirts of the city.

Now the prime suspects of Ramesh's murder, they decide to find the real killer before Gayathri catches up to them. Vasu suspects Malathi of framing them in order to inherit Radhika's wealth. When they finally meet her, Malathi explains that she had known all along that the girls had been fooling her. The young man who was pretending to be Ramesh, was actually a family friend, named Vikram, whom Malathi had been planning to marry Radhika off to.

Through their college friends, the girls discover that Gita had gone missing on that fateful night. After much difficulty, the girls find Gita hiding in at a border town. However, Gita reveals that she too is on the run from Gayathri, because she had witnessed Gayathri killing Vikram [aka Ramesh] that night. On the night of the murder, she had returned to the hostel to take some medications and had inadvertently witnessed the murder and had fled from the scene, fearing Gayathri would use her influence to cover up the crime. Unfortunately, Gayathri manages to catch up on the trio. However, the woman who had pretended to be Ramesh's mother arrives on the scene. She turns out to be a CBI officer, who had been investigating Gayathri and knows that the girls are not responsible for Vikram's murder.

Gayathri ends up having a mental breakdown. The CBI officer reveals that Gayathri had murdered Vikram to avenge her sister's paralysis. Vikram had raped Gayathri's sister in the past after Gayathri found out he was a womaniser and stopped her sister from dating him. To escape justice, she had no choice but to frame Vasu and Radhika as the murderers. The film concludes with Gayathri institutionalised at a mental asylum where the three girls, now close friends, pay her a visit.

Cast

 Jyothika as Vani Subramaniam (Vasu)
 Sharbani Mukherjee as Radhika
 Tabu as ACP Gayathri           
 Ishita Arun as Geetha
 Shweta Menon as police officer Jayshree
 Lakshmi as Malathi
 Manorama as Bhanumathy, Vani's mother 
 Bharati Achrekar as Vasu's mother (Hindi version)
 Major Ravi as Ramesh/Vikram
 Mita Vasisht as Prema Narayanan, the under cover cop
 Sukumari as the hostel warden and a history professor
 Shanthi Williams as the college principal
 Manasi Scott as Nimmi, Vani's friend
 Suchithra as Advocate Soumya 
 Manju Pillai as a police constable and Geetha's guardian
 Poornima Parameswaran as Kutti Paru
 Jomol as Savitri, Gayathri's sister (cameo appearance)
 Deepti Bhatnagar in a Special Appearance
 Shari as Arundathi (cameo appearance)
 Vadivukkarasi as Ramesh's neighbour (cameo appearance)

Production
The original story idea for the film was taken from Marathi writer Chandrakant Kulkarni, who had made the successful Marathi film, Bindhaast, based on the story last year. Priyadarshan heard about the film and asked producer Mukesh Mehta to see it and decide whether he would like to produce the movie and thus Mehta went to Bombay, saw the film and liked it. However the producer reiterated that they have taken only the main thread from the Marathi story with the rest of the film, its sub-plots and the treatment are completely different from the original. Initially, it was planned as a Malayalam film with a cast familiar to the Kerala audience. But as Priyadarshan's excitement over the project grew, the canvas got wider and the producer decided to look for a bigger audience. Thus Jyothika, Sharbani Mukherjee and Ishita Arun, daughter of Ila Arun, stepped in to give it a more national flavour. Seasoned actresses like Sukumari, Manorama, Lakshmi, KPAC Lalitha, Mita Vasisht, Tabu, and  Dipti Bhatnagar also joined the all-female team. Cinematographer Jeeva and art director Sabu Cyril also joined the team and they shot 90 per cent of the film in a college in Mysuru (previously Mysore) and the rest in Chennai (Madras), also featuring live coverage of the Dasara (Dussera) festival of Mysuru. The film was subsequently made simultaneously in Tamil and Malayalam with a title of   Raakilipattu, while a Hindi version was also planned in 2000. The title of the Tamil version of the film was taken from a song from the 2000 Mani Ratnam film Alaipayuthey. This movie was also dubbed in Kannada language with the title "Yen hudgiro Yaking hadthiro". The movie was not released due to protests across Karnataka after the kidnapping of Kannada idol Raj Kumar by Veerappan.

Jyothika prioritised her work in the project and thus delayed her schedules for Uyirile Kalanthathu in order to ensure the film was released as early as possible. The songs of the film were released at Devi Theatre with Kamal Haasan appearing as the chief guest.

Release
Release for the film was postponed several times with the makers hoping to get a simultaneous release for all versions. The team also noted the kidnapping of Kannada actor Rajkumar by bandit Veerappan as reason for the delay. Snegithiye opened to positive reviews but performed averagely at box office. However the film went on to inspire other film makers to produce all women ventures, with director Gnanasekharan announcing that his project, Aishwarya, starring Uma, Monal and Abhinayashree would be a "small-scale Snegithiye".

The film was dubbed and released in Hindi in 2007 as Friendship, but went unnoticed after arriving with very little publicity. Despite originally being planned in only Malayalam, Raakilipattu was released in Kerala, only in 2007.

Soundtrack

While S. P. Venkatesh composed the film score, all the songs were composed by Vidyasagar, except "Kannukulle" which was composed by Raghunath Seth as mentioned in the original audio cassette. The songs were well received by the audience. Lyrics were written by Vairamuthu, Pa. Vijay and Kadhalmathi.
Track listing

References

External links
 

2000 films
Indian female buddy films
Indian multilingual films
Films about women in India
2000s Tamil-language films
Films shot in Karnataka
Tamil remakes of Marathi films
Films directed by Priyadarshan
Films scored by Vidyasagar
Indian mystery thriller films
Fictional portrayals of the Tamil Nadu Police
Films featuring an all-female cast
2000 multilingual films
2000s mystery thriller films
2000s female buddy films